Scleronephthya is a genus of corals belonging to the family Nephtheidae.

The species of this genus are found in Southeastern Asia, Australia.

Species:

Paraspongodes candida 
Paraspongodes islandica 
Paraspongodes sarsii 
Scleronephthya corymbosa 
Scleronephthya crassa 
Scleronephthya flexilis 
Scleronephthya gracillimum 
Scleronephthya lewinsohni 
Scleronephthya pallida 
Scleronephthya pustulosa 
Scleronephthya spiculosa

References

Nephtheidae
Octocorallia genera